"Chuck Versus the First Kill" aired on April 13, 2009, the 20th episode of the second season, and 33rd overall. Chuck strikes a deal with his ex-girlfriend Jill (Jordana Brewster) to have her released from prison if she cooperates with his search for his father. Meanwhile, Morgan attempts to sabotage Emmett's efficiency review.

Plot summary

Main Plot

As the episode begins, the NSA and CIA have had no success in locating Chuck's father, Stephen. Chuck angrily confronts Beckman during a status update about their failure to locate him. Chuck decides that he must take matters into his own hands and interrogate a Fulcrum agent. However, none of those they captured have been willing to talk. Chuck gambles that he might be able to persuade Jill, who is currently incarcerated, to help. She initially refuses, but Chuck makes an unauthorized deal to have her brought into witness protection if she cooperates. She recommends that the team question her father's best friend, Uncle Bernie, (Ken Davitian) who recruited her into Fulcrum. She tells the team that most of the time he is well-protected and the only way to gain access to him without his bodyguards is at family gatherings. Chuck decides to manufacture one by going undercover with Jill and throwing a party to celebrate their engagement.

While Chuck and Jill meet with Jill's family, Casey and Sarah monitor from the van outside. Bernie arrives and is immediately suspicious upon seeing Jill, whom he believes had been arrested, and he confronts them in private. Chuck offers him the same deal as Jill: help him locate Stephen and in return they'll offer him witness protection. Bernie instead attempts to kill them and they flee through the house. Sarah and Casey, masquerading as Chuck's cousin and her boyfriend, arrive to back them up. Before they can reach Chuck, Bernie suffers a fatal heart attack and collapses. After his death, Casey and Chuck carry him from the party, pretending that he is still alive by moving him and speaking for him.

At Castle, Sarah tells Chuck that Jill will be returned to prison because of the failure of their mission. Chuck argues that they still need her help, but Sarah apologizes and tells him they don't have a choice. Jill returns the engagement ring the government provided her as part of the cover and says goodbye to Chuck, but as she's being led out, Bernie's phone begins to ring. Chuck retrieves the phone from the body bag and answers, stalling the Fulcrum operative on the other end while Sarah tracks him to a business used as a recruiting front by Fulcrum. Sarah guards Jill in the van while Jill walks Chuck and Casey through infiltrating the facility, where they take a test to determine their eligibility for recruitment. While taking the test, Chuck and Casey are identified and separated and Chuck is taken in for interrogation, while Casey escapes, having gotten a very low score.

Jill and Sarah enter the building to rescue them, but Sarah is identified and pinned down in a heavy firefight. Casey ambushes and shoots the Fulcrum operatives holding Chuck, then rushes from the office to help Sarah after ordering Chuck to use the office computer to determine where Stephen is being taken. Jill tries to escape during the gunfight, where she overhears that Stephen is being taken to a facility called "Black Rock." Meanwhile, the Fulcrum operative in charge returns to where Chuck is working, rushes him and slips on broken glass and topples out the window after tripping on Chuck's foot when Chuck shields himself with "The Morgan." Chuck dives for him and catches his arm, but is now slipping out himself. Jill is making her escape when she hears Chuck call for help, and after a moment of hesitation, returns and catches Chuck before he can be pulled out the window as well. The Fulcrum operative agrees to talk if Chuck helps him, but his sleeve rips free and the agent falls to his death. Jill tells Chuck that Stephen is being taken somewhere called "Black Rock," but she doesn't know where that is. The name triggers a flash and Chuck identifies it as a location outside Barstow. He then gives Jill back the ring they used earlier and tells her that the deal was a lie, and he won't let the government change him. He then lets her escape, seeing that she has redeemed herself.

Afterwards, back at Castle, Beckman is furious that not only did they fail to rescue Stephen, but Jill is now on the loose. Casey wryly suggests putting Chuck in a bunker, and though he wasn't serious, Beckman agrees and orders Sarah to tell Chuck they intercepted his father and brought him to Castle. Casey will then tranquilize him so he can be shipped back to Washington. Sarah objects to the setup but Beckman is tired of the potential liability of Chuck running around on his own and orders her to proceed. Sarah tells off Casey about how he didn't say anything, but goes to the Buy More to carry out her orders anyway. At first she tells Chuck the story given to her by Beckman, but after Chuck thanks her for always being there for him she warns him of the deception. He ditches his watch and the two flee.

Buy More

Emmett tells the team that he's up for an efficiency review and warns them not to give him any trouble. In response, Morgan does just that and organizes the rest of the employees in an effort to make Emmett look bad. However, Emmett approaches him in the storage cage and strikes a deal - the employees want him gone and he wants out of the Burbank store. The efficiency review has the chance to satisfy both of their goals so if Morgan makes him look good, Emmett will be able to leave. Morgan agrees, and has the team turned around talking up Emmett's contributions to the store.

The efficiency review is going well, but Emmett just needs a vote of support for Big Mike and asks Morgan to get it. Morgan plays on Mike's relationship with his mother to get him to confide in how he feels about Emmett, which he records and Emmett plays back for the efficiency expert. Unfortunately, Emmett reveals to Morgan he had been manipulating him from the start and that the review was not of his own performance, but instead was of Big Mike's. Big Mike is demoted to a Green Shirt and Emmett is promoted to store manager.

Production

On March 14, 2009 Jordana Brewster reported she would be returning to reprise her role of Jill Roberts. Later updates would establish the plot of the episode, with Chuck making a deal with Jill for her assistance in rescuing his father. Ken Davitian was also announced as guest-starring as "Uncle Bernie," the Fulcrum operative that recruited Jill.

Additionally, Chris Fedak and Josh Schwartz had said that by the end of the season, Chuck would be recording his first "kill." Ironically, both turned out to be entirely accidental. This episode also marked the introduction of Chuck's spy move "The Morgan," previously referenced in interviews.

Flashes

Chuck flashes when he sees Uncle Bernie.
When Chuck and Casey infiltrate the Fulcrum recruiting center, he flashes on multiple agents. As Chuck begins to flash he quickly looks at several of them, and retrieves their files in one single flash.
When Jill tells him Stephen was taken to "Black Rock," Chuck flashes on the name.

References to popular culture

The move Chuck calls “The Morgan” looks to based on the SPEAR System a self defence system utilising a persons flinch reflex.
 When the Buy More team is discussing about what to do during the inspection, Jeff says:"I can't leave the Buy More. I won't survive in the real world. I've been institutionalized."  It is a reference to The Shawshank Redemption.
 The monologue that Morgan makes to the rest of the Buy More employees is a reference to the poison scene in The Princess Bride.
 When Big Mike kisses Morgan after he is demoted, the action, dialog, and music reference The Godfather Part II.
 When Chuck breaks into the Fulcrum facility to rescue his father, the theme from Iron Eagle plays. 
Ken Davitian is no stranger to the spy genre, having played Shtarker in the 2008 film Get Smart.
President Barack Obama was referenced twice: First with the "Obama Guava" frozen yogurt Sarah brings Chuck at the beginning of the episode, and later Casey comments on the administration's 2009 ban on waterboarding.
Chuck, Casey and Sarah dragging the dead Uncle Bernie out of Jill's parents' house by pretending that he is still alive is a reference to the comedy films Weekend at Bernie's and Weekend at Bernie's II.
When Chuck flashes on Bernie, one of the newspaper clippings mentions him as an out-of-towner who ate a  steak. This is a nod to the John Candy film The Great Outdoors, in which Candy's character finishes the "Ol' 96er."
A reference is made to Subway's "Five Dollar Footlong" special.
Casey attempting to cheat off Chuck's Fulcrum enlistment test is a reference to the film Spies Like Us.
The prison cell Chuck is taken to get Jill is Room 101, which is where your worst fears come to life in George Orwell's classic Nineteen Eighty-Four.
The montage shown to the test-takers at the Fulcrum training center references a similar scene in The Parallax View.
Bill Bergey (Christopher Cousins) was the name of the Fulcrum interrogator who fell out the window to his death despite Chuck's attempt to save him. The actual Bergey played twelve seasons in the National Football League with the Cincinnati Bengals and Philadelphia Eagles.
Black Rock is a reference to the mysterious ship found on The Island in the TV show Lost

References

External links 
 

First Kill
2009 American television episodes